Neuromantic may refer to:

 Neuromantic (philosophy), a term used by anthropologist Bradd Shore
 Neuromantic (album), a 1981 album by Japanese musician Yukihiro Takahashi

See also
 Neuromancer, a 1984 science fiction novel